The Estadio Municipal "Roy Fearon" is a football stadium located in Puerto Barrios, Guatemala. It is home to third division club Izabal JC (Los Tiburones). Its capacity is 8,000. The venue bears its name in honour of local track and field athlete Roy Alfonso Fearon.

References

Roy Fearon